Relebogile Mabotja (born September 5, 1985) is an actress, presenter, radio host, singer, producer, writer, musical director and is currently based in Johannesburg, South Africa.

Early life
Relebogile Mabotja also known as Lebo was born on 5 September 1985 in Pretoria, Gauteng, South Africa. She grew up in Pretoria, South Africa where she found her prowess as an entertainer at the age of 5. While in school, she was recognized for her singing and acting.  In her final year of high school, at Pretoria High School for Girls, 2003, she was afforded the opportunity to play the role of ‘Mabel’ in the Stage production called Fame the Musical.

Career

Film and Television
In the early 2000s Lebo got the opportunity to perform at the opening of the 46664 concert at the Cape Town International Convention Centre. She also performed at the dinner banquet alongside fellow musicians Marah Louw, Shelley Meskin and Jo Redburn. Towards the end of 2004 she was afforded the opportunity to present a show on e.tv called BackChaton CrazE. She was also cast of the following TV shows: Home Affairs, Zone 14, Generations (South African TV series), Skeem Saam, Rhythm City, Isidingo, an Afrikaans sketch comedy Kompleks as well as a German Film called Traum Hotel.

She also got a presenter role on the e.tv show Gospel Grooves, which aired on Sunday mornings. She also narrated SABC 2’s Christmas special called “The 12 Days of Christmas” in 2006.

Between 2010 and 2011 she hosted Season 1 and 2 of the reality competition show which aired on SABC 1 called Dance Your Butt Off. This show is the South African version of the American Show Dance Your Ass Off.
Since March 2017, she has been a recurring guest host for SABC 3’s daily night show Trending SA.

Radio
In 2012, Lebo secured a role as a freelance radio presenter and in 2013 she went onto host Overnight Live and the Early Breakfast Show on Talk Radio 702 and 567 Cape Talk.

In 2019, she was also appointed as news reader and co-host of Metro FM’s afternoon drive show “The Kings Suite” after having served as co-host and anchor for the Breakfast Show.
In August 2019, Lebo was named ambassador for Discovery “Real Time”, channel 155 on DSTV.

Theatre
In late 2004, Lebo was afforded the opportunity to perform in an Afrikaans musical called Imbuba/Samesyn. She performed the same musical in the following festivals Klein Karoo Nasionale Kunstefees and Innibos in Oudtshoorn and Nelspruit (Mbombela) respectively.

In the late 2000s, Lebo played the role of “Pinky the Shebeen Queen” in the Soweto Story musical which was held at the Joburg Theatre in Gauteng.

Music and Voice Overs
In 2013, Lebo worked on her first musical composition, she wrote the new channel music for SABC 2’s rebrand, You Belong, together with producer and artist RJ Benjamin. She also worked on the title music for the following: the Afro Café song, Nedbank’s Ke Yona “Making the Team”, SABC 1’s Making Moves, Sunday Chillas, Mzansi Insider, Koze Kuse, The Remix SA, The Sing Off South Africa and Business Battle. SA, The Sing Off South Africa and Business Battle. In 2014, Lebo was named series producer and musical director for Season 10 of Afro Café. She also composed the theme song, directed the music and live studio band for ETV’s show “I love South Africa”. 

She also does voice overs; she is the voice behind the theme songs for Africa Magic, Africa Magic Plus for DStv and the new LOTTO theme song “One day is one day”.
In 2019 Lebo was appointed as musical director of Nigeria’s “The Winner” and this show will air on Africa Magic.

Other Projects
In 2013 she formed Lebotja Media which is a full service media house as well as a record label. She is an executive producer in the company and works with Leslie “Lee” Kasumba, Jonathan Clarke, Lebogang Morolo, Pilani Bubu as well as Paul  McIver. Lebo also writes columns and articles for Soul Magazine and Teenzone Magazine. She has also emcee’d events such as FIFA Fan Parks during the World Cup 2010, the National Teacher's Awards in 2018 and the opening and closing ceremonies of the World Choir Games.

In 2016, Lebo was appointed as a non-executive director on the SAMRO (Southern African Music Rights Organisation) board where she later served as an acting chairperson in 2019.

She is also an adjudicator and director on the Board of the National Eistedfodd Academy (NEA). She was also a preliminary judge for Mnet's Idols and a music expert for Mzansi Magic's Clash of the Choirs Season 2 and both of these shows are reality talent contests.

Producer, Director, Composer
 Afro café: producer, director, musical director, theme music, publisher 
 Making Moves, Mzansi Insider, Koze Kuse, Sunday Chillas, I love South Africa: theme music, composer, publisher 
 The Remix SA: musical director, theme music, composer 
 The Sing Off SA: musical director 
 Business Battle: series producer 
 Clash of the Choirs: music expert 
 Idols:  music consultant

Emcee
 World Choir Games

Allegations of unlawful enrichment at SAMRO 
In 2019 the Southern African Music Rights Organisation (SAMRO) sued Mabotja for unlawful enrichment. According to the court case, Mabotja and a number of other members of the leadership of SAMRO overpaid themselves by more than R1.6 Million rand. Mabotja herself was irregularly overpaid by R133 000.

SAMRO would later become the centre of a scandal regarding the underpayment of royalties to artists, much of this taking place during Mabotja's time working for the organisation.

Awards and nominations

References

External links
 
 
 

South African actresses
South African writers
21st-century South African women singers
1985 births
Living people